= Donor principle =

Spelling of loanwords

In linguistics, the donor principle refers primarily to the observance of the original spelling of a loanword from the original ("donor") language. This principle applies in particular to the standardization in the receiver language of exonyms when they are used in publications.

The term "donor principle" is sometimes also used for the particular spelling of names of specific products, brands, institutions, etc., chosen by their owner, founder, designer, etc., when it clashes with the official spelling rules. This often pertains to the use of capital letters, (e.g. YouTube), for example.
